Pituophis melanoleucus, commonly known as the pine snake, is a species of nonvenomous snake in the family  Colubridae. The species is endemic to the southeastern United States. Three subspecies are currently recognized as being valid.

Taxonomy and etymology

The pine snake, Pituophis melanoleucus, gets its Latin name from "melano" meaning black and "leucos" which means white. This is in reference to its black and white body. Three subspecies of Pituophis melanoleucus are currently recognized: the nominate subspecies P. m. melanoleucus (Daudin, 1803), the northern pine snake; P. m. lodingi (Blanchard, 1924), the black pine snake; and P. m. mugitus (Barbour, 1921), the Florida pine snake.

The subspecific name lodingi is in honor of Danish-born amateur herpetologist Peder Henry Löding (1869-1942), who lived in Alabama.

The species has a variety of common names, including: pine snake, pinesnake, common pine snake, bullsnake, black and white snake, carpet snake, chicken snake, common bullsnake, eastern bullsnake, eastern pine snake, horn(ed) snake, New Jersey pine snake, North American pine snake, northern pine snake, pilot snake, and white gopher snake.

Description

The head is small and somewhat pointed with an enlarged rostral scale that extends upward between the internasal scales. Usually, four prefrontal scales are seen. At midbody are 27-37 rows of keeled dorsal scales. The anal plate is single. The color pattern consists of a light ground color overlaid with black, brown, or reddish-brown blotches.

Geographic range and habitat
The species P. melanoleucus is found in the United States in Alabama, Florida, Georgia, Kentucky, Louisiana, Mississippi, New Jersey, North Carolina, South Carolina, Tennessee, Delaware and Virginia. The nominate subspecies occurs in southern New Jersey, southern North Carolina west through South Carolina to northern Georgia, eastern Tennessee, southeastern Kentucky and south into Alabama. P. m. lodingi occurs from southwestern Alabama to eastern Louisiana, overlapping with P. m. mugitus from southern South Carolina to Georgia and southern Florida.

The pine snake inhabits pine flatwoods, sandy pine-oak woodlands, prairies, cultivated field, open brushland, rocky desert and chaparral. The pine snake requires well-drained, sandy soils with little vegetation for use as nesting and hibernation sites. P. melanoleucus communities in New Jersey were found to hibernate communally while communities in other regions like Tennessee were found to hibernate on their own.

Ecology

The pine snake preys on rats, mice, moles and other small mammals and eggs. It often enters rodent burrows in search of a meal. In these cases, multiple kills are frequent, with the snake pressing the mice against the walls of the burrow. The snake remains underground in cold weather or during the heat of summer days.

When disturbed, it often hisses loudly, sometimes flattening its head, vibrating its tail, and eventually striking at an intruder. To make the hissing sound, the snake forces air out of its lungs, vibrating the epiglottis. Several mammal species have been known to predate upon the hibernacula and nesting burrows of pine snakes including the American red fox (Vulpes fulva), striped skunk (Mephitis mephitis) and Northern short-tailed shrew (Blarina brevicauda).

Reproduction
After mating has taken place in spring, clutches of three to 24 eggs are laid in June–August. The eggs are deposited in sandy burrows or under large rocks or logs and hatch after 64–79 days of incubation. Hatchlings measure .

Conservation status

The pine snake is classified as least concern on the IUCN Red List, due to its wide distribution and large number of subpopulations; while the total populations appears to be declining, this is likely happening at a slow rate. However, the species is thought to be impacted by continued habitat degradation and destruction. It is present in a variety of protected areas. Habitat loss is the major threat to populations of this species. Construction of hibernacula is an effective tool for enhancing the survival rates of the species.

References

Further reading
Barbour T (1921). "The Florida Pine Snake". Proc. New England Zoöl. Club 7: 117-118. (Pituophis melanoleucus mugitus, new subspecies).
Blanchard FN (1924). "A Name for the Black Pituophis of Alabama". Pap. Michigan Acad. Sci., Arts, Letters 4: 531-532. (Pituophis lodingi, new species).
Conant R, Bridges W (1939). What Snake Is That? A Field Guide to the Snakes of the United States East of the Rocky Mountains. (With 108 drawings by Edmond Malnate). New York and London: D. Appleton-Century Company. Frontispiece map + 163 pp. + Plates A-C, 1-32. (Pituophis melanoleucus, pp. 66–68 + Plate 10, figure 29; Plate 11, figure 30).
Daudin FM (1803). Histoire Naturelle, Générale et Particulière des Reptiles ..., Tome Sixième [Volume 6]. Paris: F. Dufart. 447 pp. + Plates I-X. (Coluber melanoleucus, new species, p. 409). (in French).
Goin CJ, Goin OB, Zug GR (1978). Introduction to Herpetology, Third Edition. San Francisco: W.H. Freeman. xi + 378 pp. . (Pituophis melanoleucus, pp. 122, 141).
Holbrook JE (1842). North American Herpetology; or, A Description of the Reptiles Inhabiting the United States. Vol. IV. Philadelphia: J. Dobson. 138 pp. + Plates I-XXXV. (Pituophis melanoleucus, pp. 7–10 + Plate I).
Morris, Percy A. (1948). Boy's Book of Snakes. (A volume of the Humanizing Science Series, edited by Jaques Cattell). New York: Ronald Press. viii + 185 pp.  (Pituophis melanoleucus, pp. 44–47, 180).
Powell R, Conant R, Collins JT (2016). Peterson Field Guide to Reptiles and Amphibians of Eastern and Central North America, Fourth Edition. Boston and New York: Houghton Mifflin Harcourt. xiv + 494 pp., 47 plates, 207 figures. . (Pituophis melanoleucus, pp. 391–392 + Plate 37).
Schmidt KP, Davis DD (1941). Field Book of Snakes of the United States and Canada. New York: G.P. Putnam's Sons. 365 pp., 34 plates, 103 figures. (Pituophis melanoleucus, pp. 160–162, Figure 46).

External links

 The Florida Pinesnake: Pituophis melanoleucus mugitus - University of Florida Fact Sheet 2009
"Black Snakes": Identification and Ecology - University of Florida fact sheet
 Northern Pine Snake at The Pituophis Page. Accessed 29 June 2008.
 New Jersey Pine Snake at The State of New Jersey. Accessed 29 June 2008.
 Florida Pine Snake

melanoleucus
Snakes of North America
Reptiles of the United States
Endemic fauna of the United States
Fauna of the Southeastern United States
Reptiles described in 1803
Taxa named by François Marie Daudin